Compact Camera Port 2 (CCP2) is an electrical and data interface standard for cameras used in Mobile phones. It uses high speed differential serial signaling, and is defined by the Standard Mobile Imaging Architecture (SMIA) group.

Classes
CCP2 supports several different speed classes:

References

External links
 Description archived from the SMIA website
 Compact Camera Port 2 Application Notes

Mobile telecommunications standards